The men's 100 metres event at the 1998 World Junior Championships in Athletics was held in Annecy, France, at Parc des Sports on 28 and 29 July.

Medalists

Results

Final
29 July
Wind: +1.6 m/s

Semifinals
29 July

Semifinal 1
Wind: +0.5 m/s

Semifinal 2
Wind: -1.2 m/s

Quarterfinals
28 July

Quarterfinal 1
Wind: -1.2 m/s

Quarterfinal 2
Wind: +0.2 m/s

Quarterfinal 3
Wind: -0.7 m/s

Quarterfinal 4
Wind: -0.5 m/s

Heats
28 July

Heat 1
Wind: -0.4 m/s

Heat 2
Wind: +0.4 m/s

Heat 3
Wind: -0.2 m/s

Heat 4
Wind: -0.8 m/s

Heat 5
Wind: +1.0 m/s

Heat 6
Wind: -0.3 m/s

Heat 7
Wind: -0.7 m/s

Heat 8
Wind: -0.5 m/s

Participation
According to an unofficial count, 57 athletes from 46 countries participated in the event.

References

100 metres
100 metres at the World Athletics U20 Championships